Chester Hjortur Thordarson (May 12, 1867 – January 6, 1945) — born Hjörtur Þórðarson — was an Icelandic-American inventor  and manufacturer of electrical apparatus who eventually held nearly a hundred technology patents related to transformers, inductors, high voltage coils, and more.

Biography
Thordarson immigrated to the United States from Iceland in 1873 with his parents Gudrun Grimsdotter and Thordur Arnason. In 1887, Thordarson took a job in Chicago, Illinois working for Chicago Edison Co. In 1895, he founded  the Thordarson Electric Manufacturing Company, a  manufacturing company in Chicago that produced industrial and commercial transformers. Thordarson's company is now called Thordarson Meissner, Inc. and has locations in Mount Carmel, Illinois, and Henderson, Nevada.

He was instrumental in the development of the modern energy transmission grid with his work in transformers.  He achieved his first distinction at the 1904 World's Fair in St. Louis, where for the Purdue University exhibit he designed and built the first million-volt transformer. For his efforts he won the fair's gold medal.

Legacy

Rock Island

In 1910, Thordarson began purchasing property on Rock Island, an island off the tip Wisconsin's Door Peninsula.  Thordarson  established a private vacation retreat on Rock Island. He was intensely interested in preserving the island’s natural beauty.  In 1965 the state of Wisconsin purchased Rock Island from his heirs. Thordarson's former estate has been designated Rock Island State Park. His buildings, including the water tower, were added to the National Register of Historic Places as the Thordarson Estate Historic District during 1985.

Book collection
Thordarson bequeathed his book collection to the University of Wisconsin. The Thordarson collection was estimated to be worth one million dollars in 1945 (equivalent to $ in ) and led to the establishment of the rare books room of the University of Wisconsin Memorial Library. Jen Christian Bay, a member of the Bibliographical Society of America, commented on the collection in 1929:
"Of William Copland, The Craft of Grafting (1560), two copies are known, one in the Thordarson Collection"
"Of the greatest [herbal] of all, the Hortus Sanitatis, Mr. Thordarson's copy of the edition of 1561 is a remarkably beautiful copy...."
[Of the 1540 A Boke of the Proertyes of Herbes:] "This book is one of Mr. Thordarson's discoveries;  no copy is known in any other library."
[Of H. Baker's The Wellspring of Sciences:] "The British Museum seemingly possesses no copy with an earlier date than 1574.  Mr Thordarson's copy [of 1564] seems unique."

Awards
Among his awards and honors, the University of Wisconsin  and the University of Iceland  conferred  honorary doctorate degrees. He was awarded medals from the Louisiana Purchase Exposition in 1904 and the Panama–Pacific International Exposition in 1916. King Christian X of Denmark presented Thordarson with the Order of the Falcon in 1939.

Patents

Death
Thordarson died of heart failure in Chicago, Illinois on January 6, 1945.

See also 

Charles Proteus Steinmetz – a contemporaneous electrical pioneer in alternating current and high voltage research
Nikola Tesla

References

Further reading
Cartwright, Carol Lohry (1986) "Rock Island: The Personification of Chester H. Thordarson". The Wisconsin Magazine of History, Vol. 69, No. 3 (Spring, 1986): 211-227.
Eaton, Conan Bryant (1969) Rock Island, a part of the Washington Township (Jackson Harbor Press) 
Purinton, Richard  (2013) Thordarson and Rock Island (Island Bayou Press)

External links
Thordarson Meissner, Inc. website
Rock Island State Park website
Chester Thordarson's Rock Island 

1867 births
1945 deaths
People from Door County, Wisconsin
American inventors
Chester Thordarson
American manufacturing businesspeople
People associated with electricity
American electrical engineers
Businesspeople from Chicago
Recipients of the Order of the Falcon
19th-century American engineers
20th-century American engineers
American futurologists
American humanists
American mechanical engineers
Scientists from New York City
Wireless energy transfer
Engineers from New York (state)
Engineers from Illinois